S.W.A.T. is an American procedural action drama television series, based on the 1975 television series of the same name created by Robert Hamner, developed by Rick Husky and 2003 movie of the same name by Clark Johnson. Aaron Rahsaan Thomas and Shawn Ryan developed the new series, which premiered on CBS on November 2, 2017, and is produced by Original Film, CBS Studios and Sony Pictures Television. In April 2022, the series was renewed for a sixth season which premiered on October 7, 2022.

The show exists in a shared universe with the FX crime drama The Shield, which Ryan also created.

Premise 
The series centers on Los Angeles Police Department Sergeant Daniel "Hondo" Harrelson. A lifelong Los Angeles local and former Marine, Hondo has been tapped to lead a new "last stop" Special Weapons and Tactics unit of the LAPD. Because he is both black and L.A. born and raised, Hondo feels deeply loyal not only to his "brothers in blue" but also to the people they serve.

Cast and characters

 Shemar Moore as Sergeant II Daniel "Hondo" Harrelson Jr., a Los Angeles native who was promoted to team leader in a blatant attempt to ease the tensions between the community and the LAPD after his former team leader shot an unarmed black teenager. He was demoted at the end of season 4 after leaking information of racism in the LAPD to the press before later regaining command early in season 5. As team leader his callsign was 20-David but it changed to 27-David during his demotion. He knows everyone in the neighborhood and treats them with respect and they usually give him information pertinent to his cases. He once dated Elle Trask, an FBI Agent. He was then in a clandestine relationship with Jessica Cortez, but they were ultimately forced to break it off to protect their careers despite both mutually expressing their love for each other. He later dated Nia Wells, an Assistant District Attorney, but later broke up when he had threatened to go after a man he accused of drugging his younger half-sister, Briana, at a nightclub to possibly take advantage of her. He then went onto dating Nichelle when they first cross paths helping an injured man following a pursuit of armed robbery suspects that Hondo was in. At the end of the fifth season, Hondo learns that Nichelle is pregnant with their first child.
 Stephanie Sigman as Captain Jessica Cortez (seasons 1–2), Commanding Officer of the LAPD Metropolitan Division and Hondo's lover, and then former lover. She is a respected officer who has plans to improve the relationship between the LAPD and the citizens of Los Angeles, despite some resistance from the rank and file. In the second-season finale, she accepts an offer for an FBI assignment and leaves the LAPD to go undercover. By the start of the third season, she has seemingly taken the assignment permanently, with the actress being confirmed as having exited the show.
 Jay Harrington as Sergeant II David "Deacon" Kay, a ten-year veteran of the S.W.A.T. team who was passed over for promotion in favor of Hondo in the aftermath of the Raymont Harris shooting. Although he takes the decision in stride, he later admits to Hondo he was resentful about being passed over, but made peace with it once he saw what an effective leader Hondo was. His callsign is 30-David. He acts as second in command of the team and serves as a mentor to his teammates, also serving as an instructor at the LAPD SWAT academy. He is fiercely dedicated to his job with SWAT and serving the city of Los Angeles, and was even awarded the LAPD Police Star at the end of Season 2. He is also fiercely loyal to his team, particularly Hondo, all of whom he considers family. His dedication to the team is only matched to that he has to his wife Annie (Bre Blair) and their three children; Matthew, Lila and Samuel. In "School", it is revealed that his daughter, Lila, is named after a school shooting victim. Midway into Season 2, Annie gives birth to another daughter, Victoria. In Season 3 he takes on a second job working for a private security firm. 
 Alex Russell as Officer III James "Jim" Street, a new transfer from the Long Beach Police Department.  His call sign is 26-David. His mother Karen (Sherilyn Fenn) was in prison for murdering her abusive husband/Street's father; she was arrested by former S.W.A.T Team Leader Buck Spivey. He initially has trouble adjusting to being part of the team due to his impulsiveness as well as having abandoned his duties to take care of his mother which eventually got him removed from SWAT. He has since earned his way back on the team. He continues to have an up-and-down relationship with his mother until her death in the fifth season, as well as romantic tension throughout the series with teammate Chris Alonso, which finally blossoms into a relationship just before Alonso leaves the team and the LAPD at the end of the season.
 Lina Esco as Officer III Christina "Chris" Alonso (seasons 1–5), a former canine officer and (originally) one of the two female cops assigned to S.W.A.T. Her callsign is 24-David. She serves as the Squad's sniper and becomes close friends with Street. Openly bisexual, she enters a polyamorous relationship in the second season, but breaks it off later. Alonso is the godmother to Deacon's children. At the end of the fifth season, after finally starting a relationship with Street, she leaves SWAT and the LAPD altogether to take over the duty of helping and housing illegal immigrant girls seeking asylum in the United States. The actress confirmed her departure from the series in order to pursue other job opportunities.
 Kenny Johnson as Officer III+1 Dominique Luca, a third-generation S.W.A.T officer. His callsign is 22-David. He was originally the driver and mechanic of the team's vehicle "Black Betty" until an injury placed him temporarily in a tactical support role until he was allowed to be in the field again. Johnson previously appeared on The Shield, also created by Shawn Ryan. 
 Peter Onorati as Sergeant II Jeff Mumford (season 1; recurring season 2; guest season 4), the team leader of another S.W.A.T. team alongside Hondo's.  His callsign was 50-David. He has been divorced three times; in "Payback", he gets engaged again after only a month-long courtship. In the conclusion of the second season episode "Jack", he announces his retirement from SWAT and the LAPD after being shot earlier in the episode, and makes his retirement official two episodes later.
 David Lim as Officer III Victor Tan, a former officer with the LAPD Vice Squad. His callsign is 25-David. He joined S.W.A.T. three years prior to the series. Once on track for a prestigious career at the insistence of his parents, Tan instead decided to pursue his own path in life and chose to become a police officer instead. He is very knowledgeable of the drug trade in Los Angeles from his time on Vice and maintains several connections that he will use during cases. In the season four finale, he marries his longtime girlfriend Bonnie.
 Patrick St. Esprit as Commander Robert Hicks (season 2–present; recurring season 1), a senior officer with the LAPD Special Operations Bureau. He is a widower and a longtime friend of the Kay family. He has two grown children; a daughter named Molly and a son named J.P. St. Esprit was promoted to a series regular for season 2.
 Amy Farrington as Lieutenant Detective Piper Lynch (season 3; recurring season 4), an experienced detective from LAPD Hollywood Division appointed by the mayor as a tactical consultant to Hondo's team.
 Rochelle Aytes as Nichelle Carmichael (season 6; recurring seasons 3–5), a worker at the local community center and Hondo's on-and-off love interest since the third season. As of the end of the fifth season, she is pregnant with her and Hondo's first child.

Episodes

Production

Development 
On February 3, 2017, it was announced that CBS had greenlit production of a pilot episode of a television series inspired by the 2003 film adaptation of the 1970s ABC series S.W.A.T.. The pilot was written by Aaron Rahsaan Thomas and Shawn Ryan and directed by Justin Lin.

The new series was ordered by CBS on May 12, 2017. Co-creator and executive producers Thomas and Ryan would serve as the showrunners. The series premiered on November 2, 2017. On November 17, 2017, CBS picked up the series for a full season of 20 episodes and on December 1, 2017, CBS ordered two additional episodes for the first season bringing the total to 22 episodes. On March 27, 2018, CBS renewed the series for a second season which premiered on September 27, 2018.

On March 16, 2020, Sony Pictures Television suspended production of the third season due to the COVID-19 pandemic. On May 6, 2020, CBS renewed the series for a fourth season which was set to be a mid-season premiere. However, on July 14 it was announced that it would switch places with Survivor, and premiered on November 11, 2020. On April 15, 2021, CBS renewed the series for a fifth season which premiered on October 1, 2021. On April 8, 2022, CBS renewed the series for a sixth season which premiered on October 7, 2022.

Casting 
In February 2017, Shemar Moore was announced as Daniel "Hondo" Harrelson, alongside new co-stars Kenny Johnson as Dominique Luca, who was originally named Brian Gamble, and Lina Esco as Christina "Chris" Alonso, who also originally named Sanchez. Several additional cast members were announced in March 2017. Jay Harrington plays Officer Deacon Kay, Alex Russell is James "Jim" Street, and finally, Peter Onorati was cast as Jeff Mumford. On September 21, 2017, David Lim was cast in the role of Hondo's new co-member Victor Tan and was later promoted to series regular status for first season. On October 4, 2019, Stephanie Sigman announced her departure from the show and was subsequently replaced by Amy Farrington as series regular beginning with season three.

Filming 
Filming on the fourth season began on August 4, 2020.

Broadcast and release
Sony Pictures Television distribute the series internationally. The show airs on Sunday nights on Sky Max in the United Kingdom. The show airs on Wednesday nights on AXN Asia in the Southeast Asia.

Reception

Critical response
The review aggregation website Rotten Tomatoes reported a 48% approval rating for the first season, with an average rating of 4.59/10 based on 27 reviews. The website's critical consensus reads, "Despite a commanding, charming performance from Shemar Moore, S.W.A.T. remains a simple procedural overrun with clichés." Metacritic, which uses a weighted average, assigned a score of 45 out of 100 based on 12 reviews, indicating "mixed or average reviews".

Ratings

Accolades

See also

 Flashpoint―Similar concept but focuses on a fictional elite tactical unit in Canada.
 S.W.A.T.—2003 movie also based on the original TV series.

Notes

References

External links
 
 
 

S.W.A.T. (franchise)
2017 American television series debuts
2010s American crime drama television series
2020s American crime drama television series
American action television series
English-language television shows

CBS original programming
Fictional portrayals of the Los Angeles Police Department

Television series by CBS Studios
Television series reboots
Live action television shows based on films
Television series by Sony Pictures Television
Television shows set in Los Angeles
Television productions suspended due to the COVID-19 pandemic